There was little interest in the crusades in Islamic culture prior to the 20th century. But since the 1950s, the crusades have become an ideological staple in Salafism and jihadism.

Islamic views on Europe and Christianity before the First Crusade

Western Europe held little interest for Islamic writers, who regarded their own culture as much more sophisticated and advanced (due to their progressive achievements in science and arts); the medieval Muslim felt superiority towards Christianity, as for them it was clear that Christianity was an incomplete and imperfect revelation, surpassed by the superior faith of Islam and teachings of the Prophet Muhammad. The Christians envied Muslims for their immaculate pursuits of knowledge in astronomical, mathematical, medical and literary fields and consistently recreated works of Muslim scholars. Ultimately, both faiths viewed the other as incorrect by default. Muslims referred to Europeans as "Franks" and their perception of Europe and its inhabitants was formed from a mixture of travel accounts, oral accounts from prisoners of war, pilgrims, merchants, diplomats, geographical works and popular stories. Their understanding of Europe tended to be influenced by ethnocentrism. 

Muslim geographers divided the world into seven latitudinal zones and the position of given peoples in a particular zone predisposed them towards certain attributes or dispositions. The greatest harmony and balance was found in the third and fourth zones, which encompassed the central lands of the Arab World, North Africa and eastern China. The Franks (along with the Slavs and Turks) lived in the sixth zone and like these two other groups, the Franks were regarded as pursuing the arts of warfare and hunting, were possessed by a melancholic temperament and a general proneness to savagery. They were also seen as filthy, unhygienic and treacherous. 

The Abbasid writer al-Mas'udi, writing in the 10th century, described the Franks as a "numerous, courageous, well-organised and well-disciplined people, with a vast and unified realm." al-Mas'udi goes on to describe Western Europe:

As regards the people of the northern quadrant, they are the ones for whom the sun is distant from the Zenith, those who penetrate to the North, such as the Slavs, the Franks, and those nations that are their neighbours The power of the sun is weak among them because of their distance from it; cold and damp prevail in their regions, and snow and ice follow one another in endless succession. The warm humour is lacking among them; their bodies are large, their natures gross, their manners harsh, their understanding dull, and their tongues heavy. Their color is so excessively white that it passes from white to blue; their skin is thin and their flesh thick. Their eyes are also blue, matching the character of their coloring; their hair is lank and reddish because of the prevalence of damp mists. Their religious beliefs lack solidity, and this is because of the nature of cold and the lack of warmth.

This view was common of Muslim writers, who regarded Western Europe as a harsh, frozen land and its inhabitants as large and strong but violent and unintelligent - one Persian writer even believed that Franks lacked individuality and shed their hair annually like animals. The Franks were also seen as sexually loose and having no protectiveness towards their womenfolk - while Muslims regarded it important to have pudency among both sexes and women were to only unveil in the place of certain male relatives, Franks were seen as having the two consort freely and women as undressing before complete strangers, which Islamic writers saw as immoral and regarded Frankish men as lacking "proper" marital jealousy by allowing their wives to be seen undressed before other men.

Due to the Islamic belief that climate would influence the character of a given peoples, there was also a view that Franks who settled in the Arab world for extended periods would make them more civilised. However, these were seen as exceptions and furthermore, Franks were seen as incapable of truly imitating Muslim behaviour. In general the Muslim view of the Franks was one of a people who did not follow civilised pursuits, were unhygienic and filthy, deficient in sexual morality but possessing martial prowess and were courageous and redoubtable in war.

Arab historiography
The crusaders of the 12th century mostly fought the Turkish Seljuks,  and later the Ayyubid dynasty, and were thus indirectly (and intermittently directly) allied with the Arab Abbasid Caliphate.
For this reason, according to Hillenbrand (2000), Arab historians tended to align with a western viewpoint, discussing the "Frankish wars" in the context of their own fight against the Turkic expansion. Phillips (2005) summarizes the general indifference by stating that "most Muslims" see the Crusades as "just another invasion among many in their history". Contemporary Islamic accounts did not recognise any religious or military motive for the Crusaders, who instead were simply viewed as arriving from nowhere before wreaking havoc upon Muslims.   The veneration of Saladin as chivalrous opponent of the Crusaders likewise finds no reflection in Islamic tradition before the visit of  German Emperor Wilhelm II to Saladin's tomb in 1898. The visit, coupled with anti-imperialist sentiments, led nationalist Arabs to reinvent the image of Saladin and portray him as a hero of the struggle against the West. The image of Saladin they used was the romantic one created by Walter Scott and other Europeans in the West at the time. It replaced Saladin's reputation as a figure who had been largely forgotten in the Muslim world, eclipsed by more successful figures such as Baybars of Egypt. Modern Arab states have sought to commemorate Saladin through various measures, often based on the image created of him in the 19th-century west.

Modern salafism
Renewed interest in the period is comparatively recent, arising in the context of modern salafi propaganda calling for war on the Western "crusaders".

The term ṣalībiyyūn "crusader", a 19th-century loan translation from Western historiography, is now in common use as a pejorative; Salafi preacher Wagdy Ghoneim has used it interchangeably with naṣārā and masīḥiyyīn as a term for Christians in general.

The Partition of the Ottoman Empire was, at the time, popularly depicted as a final
triumph in the long history of the crusades against Islam:  The London  Punch magazine published a drawing of King Richard the Lionheart watching the post-WWI British army entering Jerusalem with the caption, “At last, my dream come true.”  In a similar fashion, when the French General Henri Gouraud took command of Syria, he remarked, “Behold Saladin, we have returned. 
Madden (1999) argued that this European romanticising connection of the crusades  with contemporary colonialism
was what has "reshaped the Muslim memory" of the medieval crusades.
Beginning in the 1950s, following the influential History of the Crusades by Steven Runciman, 
western intellectual mainstream tended to depict the crusades as a shameful episode of colonialism. 
This, once again, tended to influence Muslim perception of the period, fuelling Arab nationalism and Islamist propagandistic depictions of westerners as hostile invaders:
"Arab nationalists and Islamists agreed fully with this [Runcimann's] interpretation of the crusades. Poverty, corruption, and violence in the Middle East were said to be the lingering effects of the crusades and subsequent European colonialism." (Madden, p. 203).

Khashan (1997) has argued that the revival of "crusading" narrative in the west is connected with the end of the Cold War
and the search for a new "good vs. evil" dichotomy in which to cast world politics.
Khan (2003) argues that the contemporary jihadist propaganda is substantially derived from the 
writings of early Islamists like Sayyid Qutb and Maududi who were educated in Western institutions in the 1950s and thus 
submerged in the "politically correct" narrative following Runcimann which was current in western academia at the time. 
The "crusader" rhetoric was fully developed in Islamist extremism and Jihadism by the end of the 1990s.
Notably, a fatwa signed by  Osama bin Laden and Ayman al-Zawahiri in 1998 called for jihad against "the crusader-Zionist alliance" (referring to the  United States and Israel).
By 2008, The Oxford Encyclopedia of the Islamic World claimed that "many Muslims consider the Crusades to be a symbol of Western hostility toward Islam".

See also
Historiography of the Crusades

References 

Islamic views
Crusades
Crusades